Sana Chebli is a Tunisian former footballer who played as a defender. She has been a member of the Tunisia women's national team.

International career
Chebli capped for Tunisia at senior level during the 2008 African Women's Championship qualification.

See also
List of Tunisia women's international footballers

References

External links

Living people
Tunisian women's footballers
Women's association football defenders
Tunisia women's international footballers
Year of birth missing (living people)
21st-century Tunisian women